Henri Henri is a Canadian film from Quebec, released in 2014. A quirky comedy described by the Montreal Gazette as an attempt to create "Quebec's own Amélie", the film is the feature debut of television and documentary director Martin Talbot.

The film stars Victor Andrés Trelles Turgeon as the title character Henri Henri, an orphan who was raised and lives in a convent in Montreal. He finds his life turned upside down when the nuns sell the convent to a real estate developer, forcing Henri to move out and learn how to make his way in the outside world.

The film garnered six Canadian Screen Award nominations at the 3rd Canadian Screen Awards, in the categories of Best Cinematography (Mathieu Laverdière), Best Costume Design (Francesca Chamberland), Best Editing (Arthur Tarnowski), Best Sound Editing (Christian Rivest), Best Original Score (Patrick Lavoie) and Best Makeup (Lizanne Lasalle).

References

External links

2014 films
Canadian comedy films
Quebec films
Films shot in Quebec
Films set in Montreal
French-language Canadian films
2010s Canadian films